Guenther Roth (German spelling Günther Roth; 12 January 1931 – 18 May 2019) was a German-American sociologist. He was recognized as the leading scholar, translator and editor of the work of Max Weber in the English-speaking world; together with Claus Wittich, he translated and edited the first complete version of Weber's classic Economy and Society in English. He was professor emeritus at Columbia University. Later, his research interest extended to the biographical aspects of the sociological classics, in particular the genealogy of Weber's family.

Roth studied at Goethe University Frankfurt under Theodor W. Adorno, Max Horkheimer and Friedrich Pollock and worked at the Institute for Social Research in Frankfurt. He arrived in the United States in 1953 and completed his graduate studies at the University of California, Berkeley. In 1960, he obtained a PhD under Reinhard Bendix with a dissertation on the development of social democracy in Imperial Germany (1871–1918).

Roth became a U.S. citizen in 1963. He taught at the University of Washington from 1970 until 1988 and then at Columbia University until his retirement in 1997.

He was married to Columbia historian Caroline Bynum.

He died on May 18, 2019.

Selected works in English 
The Social Democrats in Imperial Germany. A Study in Working-Class Isolation and National Integration. Totowa: Bedminster Press, 1963; re-issue New York: Arno Press, 1979.
Scholarship and Partisanship. Essays on Max Weber. Berkeley: University of California Press, 1971 (with Reinhard Bendix)
Max Weber’s Vision of History. Ethics and Methods Berkeley: University of California Press, 1979 (with Wolfgang Schluchter)
Weber’s ‘Protestant Ethic’: Origins, Evidence, Contexts. New York: Cambridge University Press, 1993 (edited with Hartmut Lehmann)

References

Sources

External links 
 guentherroth.com  - personal homepage, redirects to columbia.edu, retrieved 16 October 2013

1931 births
2019 deaths
People from Groß-Gerau (district)
People from the People's State of Hesse
Max Weber
German sociologists
American sociologists
German emigrants to the United States
University of California, Berkeley alumni
Goethe University Frankfurt alumni
Columbia University faculty
University of Washington faculty